Illiasu Shilla  Alhassan (born 26 October 1982) is a Ghanaian former professional footballer who played as a defender.

Career
Illiasu was born in Tema, Ghana, and began his career in Kumasi with Real Republicans—a youth club—and then King Faisal Babes, where he played in two successive campaigns in the African Confederations Cup in 2004 and 2005.

The tough tackling defender then moved to Asante Kotoko and won a place in Ghana's squad for the 2006 World Cup, despite having never played for the national team, and was only one of just four domestic-based players.

Shilla replaced Issah Ahmed at Kotoko in January 2006, and his performances in recent months were enough to convince coach Ratomir Dujkovic to take him to Germany.

His impressive performances at the World Cup grabbed the attentions of a number of big European clubs. After trials at Arsenal and Blackburn Rovers he eventually joined Russian club FC Saturn.

Shilla's contract with Saturn was cancelled in 2008. He then returned to Ghana and had to spend three years recovering from an ankle injury. He restarted his football career in 2011, signing with top-flight club Real Tamale United.

Personal life
His older brother Shilla Alhassan, played with him at Real Tamale United and played formerly for Guan United FC.

References

External links
 

1982 births
2006 FIFA World Cup players
2008 Africa Cup of Nations players
Asante Kotoko S.C. players
FC Saturn Ramenskoye players
Ghana international footballers
Ghanaian expatriate footballers
Ghanaian footballers
King Faisal Babes FC players
Living people
People from Tema
Russian Premier League players
Expatriate footballers in Russia
Expatriate footballers in Armenia
Armenian Premier League players
Association football defenders
Real Tamale United players
Ghana Premier League players